Elsewhere is an Austrian documentary film in 12 episodes which describes life in twelve very different locations. During the year 2000 Nikolaus Geyrhalter and his teams travelled to different places each month, looking for places untouched by the millennium hysteria.

Locations:

 Ekeschi, Aïr, Niger
 Karlgasniemi, Sápmi, Finland
 Ombivango, Kunene, Namibia
 Dumbol Territory, Western New Guinea, Indonesia
 Siorapaluk, Thule, Greenland
 Manmoyi, Arnhem Land, Australia
 Umla, Ladakh, India
 Kantek ko jawun, Siberia, Russia
 Zhongshi [忠实], Yunnan, China
 Tharros, Sardinia, Italy
 Gitlaxt'aamiks, British Columbia, Canada
 Falalop, Woleai, Micronesia

External links 
 

2001 films
2000s German-language films
Faliasch-language films
Greenlandic-language films
Khanty-language films
Korowai-language films
Ladakhi-language films
Naxi-language films
Nisga'a-language films
Ojihimba-language films
Sámi-language films
Sardinian-language films
Tamashek-language films
Austrian documentary films
Films directed by Nikolaus Geyrhalter
2001 documentary films
2000s English-language films